Mong Ton Township or Mong Tong Township is a township of Mongs Ton District in the Eastern Shan State of Myanmar. The capital town is Mong Ton. It borders Mong Pying Township to the north, Mong Hsat Township to the east, Mong Nai Township and Mong Pan Township to the west and Thailand to the south. Loi Hkilek mountain is located in the area. It has two townships. They are Pone Par Khem, and Mong Hta. At Mong Ton township, live in Shan, Lahu, Lisu, Wa, Burma, and Chinese.

Recent history
Given its location near the border with Thailand and internal conflict, the Burmese army has the important IB277 military base just outside the main town. There are five Burmese army battalions in Mong Ton town alone. Trafficking of narcotics is a major problem in Mong Ton and Burma is the number two opium producer in the world after Afghanistan, and one of the leading producers of amphetamines in South East Asia. The Free Burma Rangers have alleged that the army is involved in the production and trafficking of narcotics in order to profit from the trade in opium, heroin and amphetamines. Opium is cultivated and it is not only processed for trade abroad it is also consumed by some local villagers and has created drug addiction problems.

Mong Ton has had a turbulent and unstable history, with conflicts between the Shan State Army-South (SSA-S) and the Burmese Army, although the problem is worse in the Kyethi, Mong Kung, and Laihka Townships.  In Mong Ton and Mong Hsat Township, the SPDC has demanded the removal of some UWSA military outposts and the Burmese Army is exerting more pressure on Lahu militias to conscript more soldiers and prepare to fight both the SSA–S and the UWSA.  The SPDC supported three basic military training courses for the Lahu militia in Mong Ton during 2009.

References

 
Mongsat District